Giovanni Battista Coletti (born 8 December 1948) is an Italian fencer. He won a silver medal in the team foil event at the 1976 Summer Olympics.

References

1948 births
Living people
Italian male fencers
Olympic fencers of Italy
Fencers at the 1976 Summer Olympics
Olympic silver medalists for Italy
Olympic medalists in fencing
Sportspeople from Treviso
Medalists at the 1976 Summer Olympics